The 2011–12 SM-liiga season was the 37th season of the SM-liiga, the top level of ice hockey in Finland, since the league's formation in 1975. The title was won by JYP Jyväskylä who defeated Pelicans Lahti in the finals. The title was 2nd in team history.

Teams

 Head coaches marked with ‡ took their jobs mid-season.

Regular season
Each team played four times against every other team (twice home and twice away), getting to 52 games. Additionally, the teams were divided to two groups, where teams would play one extra game. One group included Blues, HIFK, Jokerit, JYP, KalPa, Pelicans and SaiPa, while other had HPK, Ilves, Kärpät, Lukko, Tappara, TPS and Ässät.

Additionally, there were two games where teams could choose the opponents. These were played back-to-back in January and the choices were made in December, with team with lowest point total to that date was able to choose first. These pairs were: Ilves-Tappara, SaiPa-HPK, TPS-Lukko, Kärpät-Blues, JYP-HIFK, Jokerit-Pelicans and Ässät-KalPa.

Top six advanced straight to quarter-finals, while teams between 7th and 10th positions played wild card round for the final two spots. The last-placed team Ilves will play best-of-seven series against Mestis winner Sport.

Playoffs

Wild card round (best-of-three) 
Kärpät-TPS 2–0
Kärpät-TPS 4–1
TPS-Kärpät 1–2

Blues-Lukko 2–1
Blues-Lukko 1–0 (OT)
Lukko-Blues 2–0
Blues-Lukko 6–3

Quarterfinals (best-of-seven) 
KalPa-Blues 3–4
KalPa-Blues 3–1
Blues-KalPa 0–1
KalPa-Blues 5–0
Blues-KalPa 3–1
KalPa-Blues 2–5
Blues-KalPa 4–3 (OT)
KalPa-Blues 1–4

 Blues became first team in SM-liiga history to overcome 0–3 deficit to win the series.

Pelicans-Kärpät 4–3
Pelicans-Kärpät 5–0
Kärpät-Pelicans 4–3 (OT)
Pelicans-Kärpät 1–4
Kärpät-Pelicans 4–1
Pelicans-Kärpät 4–2
Kärpät-Pelicans 3–4 (OT)
Pelicans-Kärpät 3–2

HIFK-Jokerit 0–4
HIFK-Jokerit 1–3
Jokerit-HIFK 3–2 (OT)
HIFK-Jokerit 1–3
Jokerit-HIFK 2–0

JYP-Ässät 4–0
JYP-Ässät 4–1
Ässät-JYP 1–2
JYP-Ässät 4–3
Ässät-JYP 1–4

Semifinals (best-of-seven) 
Pelicans-Blues 4–1
Pelicans-Blues 5–3
Blues-Pelicans 1–3
Pelicans-Blues 1–2 (OT)
Blues-Pelicans 4–6
Pelicans-Blues 2–1

JYP-Jokerit 4–1
JYP-Jokerit 2–1 (OT)
Jokerit-JYP 2–3
JYP-Jokerit 3–2 (2OT)
Jokerit-JYP 2–1
JYP-Jokerit 3–2 (OT)

Bronze-medal game 
Jokerit-Blues 4–3 (2OT)

Finals (best-of-seven) 
Pelicans-JYP 1–4
Pelicans-JYP 2–0
JYP-Pelicans 6–2
Pelicans-JYP 1–4
JYP-Pelicans 5–4 (OT)
Pelicans-JYP 1–2 (OT)

Relegation (best-of-seven)

Ilves-Sport 4–1
Ilves-Sport 6–1
Sport-Ilves 1–5
Ilves-Sport 0–2
Sport-Ilves 2–3 (OT)
Ilves-Sport 4–0

1
Finnish
Liiga seasons